Avalanche (also known as Escape from Alaska) is a 1999 Canadian-American disaster film directed by Steve Kroschel and starring C. Thomas Howell and Thomas Ian Griffith.

Cast
 Thomas Ian Griffith as Neal Meekin
 Caroleen Feeney as Dr. Lia Freeman
 R. Lee Ermey as Gary
 C. Thomas Howell as Jack
 John Ashton as Kemp
 Geoffrey Lower as Jay Weston
 Hilary Shepard as Annie (credited as Hilary Shepard-Turner)
 Gary Kasper as Tiny

References

External links
 Avalanche at the Internet Movie Database

1999 films
1999 action films
1990s disaster films
1999 independent films
American disaster films
American action films
American independent films
American survival films
Canadian disaster films
Canadian action films
Canadian independent films
English-language Canadian films
Avalanches in film
1990s English-language films
1990s American films
1990s Canadian films